Bisgood is a surname. Notable people with the surname include:

 Bert Bisgood (1881–1968), English cricketer, brother of Eustace
 Eustace Bisgood (1878–1958), English cricketer
 Jeanne Bisgood (born 1923), English golfer, daughter of Bert